The Stronger Woman is a 1953 West German drama film directed by Wolfgang Liebeneiner and starring Gertrud Kückelmann, Hans Söhnker and Antje Weisgerber. It was shot at the Tempelhof Studios in West Berlin and on location at the Schloss Büdingen. The film's sets were designed by the art directors Emil Hasler and Walter Kutz.

Synopsis
After a car accident confines her to a wheelchair and halts her career, an opera singer suspects that her architect husband has begun an affair with an attractive young interior designer he has met.

Cast
Gertrud Kückelmann as Sybille Erler
Hans Söhnker as Jochen Faber
Antje Weisgerber as Elisabeth Faber
Paul Henckels as Draaden
Tilly Lauenstein as Dr. Hanna Claassen
Tilla Durieux as Mutter der Fürstin
Heinz Klingenberg as Fürst von Hartefeld-Rosenau
Elsa Wagner as Frau Prein
Maria Sebaldt as Hertha
Harald Juhnke as Alfred
Lou Seitz as Frau Huber
Paul Bildt as Professor Wolters
Emil Suhrmann as Lawyer Medemann
Richard Handwerk as Waisenhausdirektor
Rita Streich as herself - singer
Ernst Legal as walker
Wolfgang Liebeneiner as conductor

References

External links

1953 drama films
German drama films
West German films
Films directed by Wolfgang Liebeneiner
German black-and-white films
1950s German films
1950s German-language films
Films shot at Tempelhof Studios